Lucas Chanson (born 29 October 1962) is a Swiss judoka. He competed in the men's half-lightweight event at the 1984 Summer Olympics.

References

1962 births
Living people
Swiss male judoka
Olympic judoka of Switzerland
Judoka at the 1984 Summer Olympics
Place of birth missing (living people)